Lepidocyrtus is a genus of slender springtails in the family Entomobryidae. There are at least 30 described species in Lepidocyrtus.

Species

References

Hexapoda
Springtail genera